The Gete is a river in Belgium which flows south to north. It is a left tributary of the Demer.

The Gete is formed by the confluence of the rivers Grote Gete ("Large Gete") and Kleine Gete ("Small Gete") near Budingen. The river was the historical border between the Prince-Bishopric of Liège and the Duchy of Brabant.

The source of the Grote Gete is situated in the village of Perwez. The river flows through Jodoigne, Hoegaarden and Tienen.

The source of the Kleine Gete is in the village of Ramillies. It flows through Orp-Jauche, Hélécine and Zoutleeuw.

Rivers of Belgium
Rivers of Flemish Brabant
Rivers of Limburg (Belgium)
Rivers of Walloon Brabant
Perwez
Ramillies, Belgium